The Missouri Department of Corrections is the state law enforcement agency that  operates state prisons in the U.S. state of Missouri. It has its headquarters in Missouri's capital of Jefferson City.

The Missouri Department of Corrections has 21 facilities statewide, including 2 community release centers. It has more than 11,000 employees, about three-quarters of whom are either certified corrections officers or probation officers. Missouri Department of Corrections has K9 units statewide that are frequently utilized for tracking escapees and, in cases of small or rural law enforcement agencies, criminals who have fled from law enforcement or assisting in search and rescue for missing persons.

Operations
Prisoners newly inducted into the MDOC system are placed in diagnostic institutions. Adult male prisoners may go to either the Eastern Reception & Diagnostic Center, the Fulton Reception & Diagnostic Center, or the Western Reception & Diagnostic Center. All incoming female prisoners, including adults and minors under 17 who are convicted on adult charges in adult courts, are sent to the Women's Eastern Reception, Diagnostic & Correctional Center. Male prisoners under 17 years of age who are convicted in adult criminal courts were sent to the Northeast Correctional Center which no longer houses minor offenders, minors are now sent to Farmington Correctional Center. Male death row inmates are sent directly to Potosi Correctional Center.

The department has a problem with harassment of and by its employees. During the period from fiscal 2002 to 2006, the state paid out just $340,000 in court awards to its own employees. During the period from 2012 to 2016, the figure was over $7.5 million. Court documents show a culture of sexual and racial harassment by employee against other employees.

Fallen officers and staff members 
Since the establishment of the Missouri Department of Corrections, thirteen officers and two staff members have died while on duty.

The causes of death are as follows:

History
The Cornerstone of the correctional system in Missouri was the Missouri State Penitentiary Jefferson City in 1836.

Death row

Potosi Correctional Center (PCC) and Eastern Reception, Diagnostic and Correctional Center (ERDCC) each have a male death row, while Women's Eastern Reception, Diagnostic and Correctional Center (WERDCC) has the female death row. ERDCC houses the state's execution chamber.

The first person executed in the modern era was George Mercer who was executed at the Missouri State Penitentiary in Jefferson City, Missouri on January 6, 1989.  The next 61 executions starting with Gerald Smith were done at the Potosi Correctional Center in Potosi, Missouri.  Since April 2005, executions have been 25 miles east of Potosi at the Eastern Reception, Diagnostic and Correctional Center in Bonne Terre, Missouri.  The first execution at Bonne Terre was #63 Donald Jones.

Deaths of prisoners
As of March 2010, the leading cause of prisoner deaths is cancer. Heart disease and liver disease are the next most common causes of prisoner deaths. Among all Missouri residents,  heart disease, cancer, and chronic lower respiratory disease are the most frequent causes of deaths.

Facilities

Below is a list of Missouri state correctional facilities.

Former facilities:

 Missouri State Penitentiary (closed in 2004)
 Central Missouri Correctional Center (closed June 2005)

As of 2010 the state did not use private prisons or export prisoners to facilities in other states.  Previously, in 1995, the state had exported prisoners to the Newton County Correctional Center in Newton, Texas, to temporarily alleviate overcrowding.  The two private prisons in the state (Integrity Correctional Center near Holden, Missouri and Bridewell Prison in Bethany, Missouri) both closed in 2010, and had never held Missouri state inmates.

Missouri Reentry Conference
Each year, the Missouri Department of Corrections co-sponsors a Missouri Reentry Conference held in Tan-Tar-A Resort in Osage Beach. The conference, which began in 2005, features speakers and workshops concerning issues surrounding Missouri’s ex-offender population. The conferences average over 300 attendees annually. The intent of the conference is to provide high-quality education and networking opportunities for corrections professionals and community-based partners involved in the state’s reentry process.

In addition to the Missouri Department of Corrections, other co-sponsors include Area Resources for Community and Human Services (ARCHS), the Missouri Department of Social Services, and Family and Community Trust (FACT).

See also 
 List of law enforcement agencies in Missouri
 List of United States state correction agencies
 List of U.S. state prisons
 Prison

References
Missouri Jail inmate license records and other vital records.

External links
Missouri Department of Corrections

Publications by or about Missouri Department of Corrections at Internet Archive.

Lists of United States state prisons
 
Corrections, Department of
State corrections departments of the United States
1820 establishments in Missouri Territory